Dhoom is a 2004 Indian Hindi-language action thriller film directed by Sanjay Gadhvi and written by Vijay Krishna Acharya, based on a story by producer Aditya Chopra. The film stars Abhishek Bachchan, John Abraham, Uday Chopra, Esha Deol and Rimi Sen. It is the first installment of the Dhoom franchise. The cinematography was done by Nirav Shah, and the original soundtrack was composed by Pritam, while Salim–Sulaiman provided the background score for the film.

Dhoom was the first action film produced by Yash Raj Films in 16 years, ever since Yash Chopra's Vijay (1988). It tells the story of a cat & mouse game between a motorbike gang which commits robberies throughout Mumbai and a Mumbai police officer who teams up with a motorbike dealer to stop them.

It received mixed reviews from critics, with praise for its performances, action sequences and soundtrack, but criticism for its script and was negatively compared to other Hollywood action-thriller heist franchises like Fast and Furious, Death Race and Ocean's. It developed into a cult film over the years since its release. 

At the 50th Filmfare Awards, Dhoom received 6 nominations, including Best Film, Best Villain (Abraham) and Best Music Director (Pritam), and won 2 awards – Best Editing and Best Sound Design. 

It spawned a film series, with its sequel Dhoom 2 which released on 24 November 2006, and Dhoom 3 which released on 20 December 2013.

Plot
 
The story starts in the city of Mumbai, where a gang of robbers on hi-tech motorbikes, led by charismatic Kabir, is sweeping through Mumbai, outwitting the police at every turn, breaking into banks and other public places and vanishes onto the Western Express Highway.

Assistant Commissioner of Police Jai Dixit, a no-nonsense cop, is called onto the case. Dixit seeks the help of a local bike dealer/racer named Ali Akbar Fateh Khan and devises a trap to catch the gang, but it fails. Kabir, the leader of the gang, eventually taunts Dixit, claiming that Dixit can't catch him even if he is right in front of him. He is proven correct, and Dixit's failure apparently causes him to part ways with Ali.

Kabir then lures Ali into his gang as a substitute for Rohit, the gang member who was killed by Dixit. Ali falls in love with Sheena, another gang member. The gang later goes to Goa to perform one last big heist before disbanding forever. Kabir sets his eyes on the largest casino in all of India. Kabir and his gang swiftly loot the casino on New Year's Eve, but they soon realize that Dixit has led them right into a trap. It is revealed that Ali was working for Dixit the whole time, and a fight ensues.

Kabir manages to escape from Dixit and goes back to the gang's truck, where Ali has kept Sheena bound and gagged. Kabir then viciously beats up Ali for his betrayal, but Ali is saved by Dixit's timely arrival at the scene. The gang flees, except for Sheena, while Dixit and Ali give chase to Kabir. They kill all the other gang members except Kabir, who tries to escape on his bike. He is cornered by Dixit and Ali with nowhere to go. Kabir decides to take his own life rather than let Dixit arrest him, knowing he can't run away anymore after suffering a gunshot from Jai to his hand. He rides his bike over the edge of a cliff into the water, to his death. The film ends with Dixit and Ali arguing with each other, albeit in a friendly way.

Cast
 Abhishek Bachchan as ACP Jai Dixit
 Uday Chopra as Ali Akbar Fateh Khan, a bike racer
John Abraham as Kabir, the gang leader
 Esha as Sheena, only female member of gang who lured Ali eventually falling for him
 Rimii as Sweety, Jai's wife
 Manoj Joshi as Shekhar
 Aarav Chowdhary as Rahul , gang's second-most important member
 Farid Amiri as Tony
 Mehul Bhojak as Manu
 Rohit Chopra as Rohit
 Palash Dutta as Chottu
 Sanjay Keni as Munna
 Ajay Pande as Vinod
 Ayesha Raza as Sunaina, a reporter
 Mukesh Ahuja as a bookie
 Ashwin Kaushik as Mr. What
 Bhupinder as Chor Bazaar goon
 Yusuf Hussain as the D.G.
 Perizaad Zorabian and Arjun Sablok (special appearance)

Production
Aditya Chopra initially had car chases in mind instead of bikes, but Sanjay Gadhvi convinced him otherwise as the rider's faces can be seen, and he had a craze for bikes in his youth.

Reception

Box office
Dhoom was a commercial success at the box office and ended up netting about Rs. 4.5 crores from the Mumbai circuit in 2004. Overseas gross of Dhoom stands at US$2 million with its U.S. gross at $330,400.

Critical response
Rajesh Karkera of Rediff.com said that "Dhoom does have a few loopholes but the film's fast-paced energy is more than enough to ensure your eyes don't stir from the screen for two-and-a-half hours", on the performance side, Chopra "steals the show", Bachchan is "impressive as the cool and confident cop. Abraham stalks though his role with ease. Deol and Sen only need to look beautiful in their limited presence in this sweat 'n' leather flick". Chitra Mahesh from The Hindu said that the film takes the genre of The Fast and the Furious, Ocean's Eleven and similar others, and wrote that "the actions scenes are extremely well done with zooms and pacy editing, while the music is more raucous than melodious". Appreciating the acting, she said, "Chopra is delightful. Bachchan as Jai does his role with style and grit and is proving to be a wonderful actor. Abraham looks terrific and suits the role of the mean-but-savvy thief".

Time Out critic stated: "Shamelessly ripping off plot ideas and entire sequences from Tango & Cash, Lethal Weapon, The Fast and Furious, Ocean's Eleven and Thelma and Louise, this energetic and surprisingly enjoyable nonsense zooms along at full-throttle, braking only for the peppy songs". Rating 3 out of 5, David Parkinson from Radio Times called it a "slick and stylish Indian drama" and wrote: "Style unashamedly triumphs over substance throughout, but the story rattles along and the set pieces are very slickly staged ... this rousing adventure owes as much to Hollywood and Hong Kong as it does to the crime classics of the 1970s". Omar Ahmed from Empire rated 2 in 5 and said that "Clearly regarding itself as Bollywood's answer to The Fast and The Furious, director Gadhvi's latest marks a departure for studio Yash Raj Films. Sadly, it's not the good kind of departure, with the studio abandoning its usually innovative approach and replacing it with an anxious attempt to blind its audience with style ... Another film that falls into the classic trap of trying to beat Hollywood at its own game instead of focusing on its primary strength – cultural uniqueness", but opined that the actors' performances are remarkable.

Taran Adarsh of IndiaFM rated 1.5 out of 5, and said: "Dhoom has gloss, but no substance. Dhoom has style, but no script. Dhoom has thrills in abundance, but the outcome is least exciting. In short, Dhoom ranks amongst YRF's weakest films" and that the film relies "too heavily on thrills", the bike chase in the story are "far more interesting than the story itself. In fact, all you remember at the end of the show are some expertly-executed chases [Allan Amin], not the drama"; the film also seems to take inspirations from The Fast and The Furious and Biker Boyz. Calling Dhoom a "testosterone-overdose", Anupama Chopra of India Today wrote that "Dhoom is adolescent heaven-fast bikes, hot babes, tons of kick-ass action with no-strings-attached ... But there are lots of trendy split screenshots of shiny bikes burning rubber and fast-paced stunts involving boats and trucks. Not to mention sexy songs with water hoses. Acting isn't the point here either. The performances are pure posture."

Awards and nominations

Soundtrack

Pritam composed the songs for Dhoom while Salim–Sulaiman composed the original score. The title track "Dhoom Dhoom" was released in a remixed version song by the Thai-American singer Tata Young. The song and its music video featuring Tata Young proved to be a major hit in India during 2004 and 2005. The original song was sung by Sunidhi Chauhan. Other tracks on the soundtrack included "Dilbara", "Dilbar Shikdum", and "Salaame Salaame", sung by singers like KK, Abhijeet Bhattacharya, Shaan and Kunal Ganjawala. The lyrics were penned by Sameer. According to the Indian trade website Box Office India, with around 22,00,000 units sold, this film's soundtrack album was the year's third highest-selling.

Real-life influence

Several bank robberies happened shortly after the film released in the similar style as shown in the film.

References

External links
 
 
 
 

2004 films
2004 action thriller films
Indian action thriller films
2000s Hindi-language films
Films directed by Sanjay Gadhvi
Films set in Mumbai
Films shot in Mumbai
Indian heist films
Yash Raj Films films
Films featuring songs by Pritam
Fictional portrayals of the Maharashtra Police
2000s heist films